The Voice of Azerbaijan is an Azerbaijani television singing competition created by John de Mol. The first season was broadcast on AzTV. The show premiered in late 2015 continuing to 2016. The rules of the show were based on The Voice of Holland. The show will have a reboot for the second season and will premiere on October 8, 2021.

Series overview
 
  Team Faiq
  Team Manana
  Team Mübariz
  Team Tünzale
  Team Murad
  Team Brilliant
  Team Eldar

Kids version

  Team Murad
  Team Zulfiyya
  Team Chingiz

Teams
Colour key

Blind auditions
Colour key

Episode 1 (Feb. 7)

Episode 2 (Feb. 14)

Episode 3 (Feb. 21)

Episode 4 (Feb. 28)

Episode 5 (Mar. 6)

The Battles

The Sing-offs
Colour key

İctimai Television temporarily suspended the remaining episodes following Azerbaijan's COVID-19 pandemic. Air dates for the remainder of the first kids season will be announced later on.

Native songs version

References

External links 

 Official Website 

Azerbaijan
Azerbaijani music
2015 Azerbaijani television series debuts
Azerbaijani television shows
AzTV original programming